The 1974–75 season was the second season of the Takht Jamshid Cup of Iranian football. The competition was won by Taj Football Club of Tehran.

Results

 Note: No team was relegated.

Top goalscorers

References 
Pars sport

Takht Jamshid Cup
Iran
1974–75 in Iranian football